Ossian Rudolf Nylund (22 April 1894 in Helsinki – 19 December 1939) was a Finnish track and field athlete who competed in the 1920 Summer Olympics. In 1920 he finished seventh in the triple jump event. He also participated in the pentathlon competition. He was twelfth overall but did not start in the final 1500 metres run.

References

External links
List of Finnish athletes

1894 births
1939 deaths
Athletes from Helsinki
Finnish male triple jumpers
Finnish pentathletes
Olympic athletes of Finland
Athletes (track and field) at the 1920 Summer Olympics